The University of British Columbia's (UBC) Point Grey Campus is the main campus of the university. It is located on the Point Grey peninsula in British Columbia, Canada. It is home to close to 55,000 undergraduate and graduate students. The  campus is also home to a numerous residential housing developments that were built by UBC in conjunction with private developers.

The campus is adjacent to, but not part of, the City of Vancouver and the University Endowment Lands.

Housing

Private residential neighbourhoods
The following residential neighbourhoods are situated on UBC's campus:

 Chancellor Place
 East Campus
 Hampton Place
 Hawthorn Place
 Wesbrook Place

Student housing
There are numerous student housing residences throughout UBC's campus. These residences serve varying demographics. For example, some serve just first-year students, while others serve students with families and visiting scholars.

First-year housing
 Place Vanier
 Totem Park
 Orchard Commons

New and returning student housing
 Ritsumeikan–UBC House
 Walter Gage

Upper-year and graduate housing
 Fairview Crescent
 Marine Drive
 Iona House
 Brock Commons Tallwood House
 Fraser Hall
 Ponderosa Commons
 Thunderbird
 Acadia Park
 Green College
 St. John's College

Campus academic facilities

Student Union Building (SUB)

The SUB is home to most of the student clubs at UBC, as well as UBC Food Services (which include fast food services such as A&W and Starbucks), a Travel Cuts location, a salon, both a bar and a pub, a movie theatre, and other student services. It is owned and operated by the Alma Mater Society of the University of British Columbia.

Museums and galleries
There are also several museums and performing arts theatres on campus, including the Morris and Helen Belkin Art Gallery, the Museum of Anthropology at UBC, the Beaty Biodiversity Museum, the Frederic Wood Theatre, and the Chan Centre.

Sports and recreation

There are many sports facilities located on the UBC campus. UBC's sports teams are called the UBC Thunderbirds and they play at various locations on campus, including War Memorial Gym, Thunderbird Stadium, UBC Aquatic Centre and Thunderbird Winter Sports Centre. The Student Recreation Centre (REC) is home to intramural sports for students.

2010 Winter Olympics

For the 2010 Winter Olympics and Paralympics, the Thunderbird Winter Sports Centre was replaced by a newer building, named the Doug Mitchell Thunderbird Sports Centre. Demolition of the old arena began in April 2006 and the arena opened on July 7, 2008. The new structure houses three ice rinks, with the main rink accommodating 6,800 spectators.

Economy

Film industry

Because many films require university scenes, the campus area is a desirable filming location. Combined with the fact that the Vancouver area is the third-largest film production centre in North America, this has made UBC a popular location for many productions. Production companies that wish to shoot on-campus must pay a fee to the university, which goes to the film and theatre departments.

Some notable movies and television shows shot on campus include:
X-Men Origins: Wolverine: Buchanan Tower 
The Exorcism of Emily Rose: UBC's MacMillan Building as the courthouse, Kenny Building as the dorm and Buchanan Building
88 Minutes: UBC's Koerner Library area
Taken: UBC's General Services Administration Building for hostage scenes
Try Seventeen: UBC's Chan Centre for student orientation scenes
She's the Man: UBC's Thunderbird Stadium for soccer stadium scenes
The Butterfly Effect: Koerner Library area, Room 100 of the UBC Geography Building as the lecture hall, and the main mall.
Wind Chill: UBC's Main Mall
The 4400: Chan Centre as "The 4400 Center," University Marketplace
Antitrust: Chan Centre
Smallville: Koerner and Main Libraries, for exteriors
Battlestar Galactica: Rose Garden and Chan Centre exterior for "Cloud Nine"
MacGyver: Various campus exteriors
Fringe: Flagpole Plaza, Chan Centre exterior and interior, Macleod and Brimacombe Buildings exterior

References

University of British Columbia
Universities and colleges in British Columbia